Last and First Men is a 2020 Icelandic science fiction film directed by Jóhann Jóhannsson in his posthumous feature film directorial debut.

The film is based on the 1930 science fiction novel of the same name by the English writer Olaf Stapledon. The film had its world premiere at the 70th Berlin International Film Festival on 25 February 2020, and was digitally released on 30 July, by BFI Distribution in the United Kingdom. Jóhann's only directorial work, Last and First Men premiered two years after his death and was met with widespread critical acclaim upon release.

Background 
Icelandic composer Jóhann Jóhannsson directed and scored a multimedia Last and First Men, "combining a film narrated by actress Tilda Swinton and accompanying score played by the BBC Philharmonic" at the 2017 Manchester International Festival. The 16mm black-and-white film is predominantly of memorial sculptures erected in the former Republic of Yugoslavia. Jóhann collaborated with José Enrique Macián on writing the narration adapted from Stapledon's novel. This was next performed at the Barbican Centre, London in December 2018, and later at Sydney Opera House as part of the Vivid Festival, on 2 June 2019. In 2020, a film of this work was released as Jóhann's debut and final directorial work, with sound artist Yair Elazar Glotman completing the work after Jóhann's death in February 2018. The film had its world premiere at the 70th Berlin International Film Festival on 25 February 2020, and was later screened at other film festivals around the world and released on VOD. It was first released on 30 July 2020 by BFI Distribution in the United Kingdom.

Production 
The film was shot at numerous Yugoslav World War II monuments and memorials in the following locations:
 Podgarić, Croatia
 Sanski Most, Bosnia and Herzegovina
 Tjentište, Bosnia and Herzegovina
 Ostra, Serbia
 Jasenovac, Croatia
 Mostar, Bosnia and Herzegovina
 Niš, Serbia
 Popina, Serbia
 Mitrovica, Kosovo
 Bihać, Bosnia and Herzegovina
 Novi Travnik, Bosnia and Herzegovina
 Petrova Gora, Croatia
 Kadinjača, Serbia
 Nikšić, Montenegro

Music 

The film's soundtrack of the same name, co-composed by Jóhann and Yair Elazar Glotman, was released by Deutsche Grammophon on 28 February 2020.

Reception

References

External links 
 
 

2020 films
English-language Icelandic films
Films based on British novels
Icelandic science fiction films
Icelandic black-and-white films
2020 science fiction films
Post-apocalyptic films
Future history
Films shot in Bosnia and Herzegovina
Films shot in Croatia
Films shot in Kosovo
Films shot in Montenegro
Films shot in Serbia
Films shot in 16 mm film
2020s English-language films